Saba Novin Qom Football Club is an Iranian football club based in Qom, Iran. They currently compete in Qom's Provincial League.

Season-by-Season 
The table below shows the achievements of the club in various competitions.

First-team squad

See also 
 Hazfi Cup
 Iran Football's 3rd Division 2011–12
 Saba Qom Futsal Club
 Saba Qom Football Club

References

External links 
 Official club website
 Latest News Club Saba Qom

Football clubs in Iran
Association football clubs established in 2008